{{Infobox person
| name               = Alice Levine
| image              = 
| alt                = 
| caption            = 
| birth_date         = 
| birth_place        = Beeston, Nottinghamshire, England
| nationality        = British
| alma_mater         = University of Leeds
| occupation         = DJ and television presenter
| years_active       = 2008–present
| employer           = BBC, Channel 4, Wondery
| known_for          = 
Alice Esme Levine (born 8 July 1986) is an English radio and television presenter, narrator, and comedian.

Early life and education
Levine was born in Beeston, Nottinghamshire. Her father is a retired lecturer at the University of Nottingham. Her mother is a caterer and former artist. She attended Alderman White School in Bramcote.

Levine studied English at the University of Leeds, where she met Jamie Morton and James Cooper, her collaborators on My Dad Wrote a Porno. She played an active part in Leeds Student Television, the university's TV station.

Career
Levine was voted "Best On-Screen Female" at the National Student Television Awards in 2008. Her first television job was hosting Celebrity Bites for MTV, which later led to other shows including coverage of their Europe Music Awards. 

Levine hosted Big Brother's Bit on the Side with Jamie East, from the reality show's revival in 2011 on Channel 5, until 2013 when they left the show. During this time, she was one of the voices of "Big Brother" herself, which included talking to housemates in the diary room and announcing tasks and news to the housemates. She also has worked on Channel 4's Pop Up Pop Quiz. In 2012, Levine appeared on Channel 4's 8 Out of 10 Cats.

On 7 January 2013, Levine joined BBC Radio 1 to present a show with Phil Taggart in the much coveted John Peel slot. The show was broadcast from 10pm to midnight on Mondays to Thursdays. She hosted Lovebox coverage for Xbox. The same year, she was a presenter on the Red Bull Soap Box Race on Dave TV. In October 2013 she appeared on Nevermind the Buzzcocks on BBC2 on Noel Fielding's team. In August 2014, she left her weeknight slot with Taggart to present a solo weekend afternoon show on the station (1pm–4pm) taking over from Huw Stephens. In 2014, she hosted the Barclaycard Mercury Music Sessions for Channel 4, as well as coverage of the Mercury Music Prize later that year.

On 16 November 2014, it was announced that Levine, along with several other celebrities and the choirmaster Gareth Malone had reached Number 1 in the UK music chart with their cover version of Avicii's "Wake Me Up" in aid of the charity Children In Need.

She is one of the three co-creators of the podcast My Dad Wrote a Porno.

In 2016, Levine presented the red carpet for the British Independent Film Awards with Geoff Lloyd.

In February 2017, as well as in 2018 and 2019, Levine presented backstage at the BRIT Awards for ITV2. She was also the red carpet and backstage host for the BAFTA Craft Awards, followed by the BAFTA TV Awards in May the same year. Levine presented Levine on Love, a series on BBC iPlayer in which she explored the world of modern romance. She also appeared in the fifth series of Alan Davies: As Yet Untitled for Dave.

In 2018, Levine was one of five contestants in the sixth series of the comedy game show Taskmaster on Dave. She appeared in series 7 of Room 101 on BBC2. Levine also co-hosted a series of Channel 4's reality show, The Circle, with Maya Jama. However, they were replaced in the second series by Emma Willis.

In 2019, Levine visited Tallinn in Travel Man for Channel 4, as well as presenting Sleeping with the Far Right, also for Channel 4. Levine has hosted the Women in Music Awards for seven years running as of 2022.

In addition to her broadcast work, Levine co-founded a food and lifestyle brand, Jackson & Levine, with business partner Laura Jackson. As a pair, they are the food columnists for Marie Claire, take part in the monthly column, the Food Club with Jackson for Company magazine, and have published a book. Levine has designed three blouses for Finery and designed two ranges for Habitat under Jackson & Levine; the first range was a linen collection followed by a ceramics range which sold out within three hours.

On 15 July 2020, Levine announced that she was leaving Radio 1 after nine years at the station. She revealed the news via an Instagram post. Her last show was on 9 August 2020 after a series of three farewell shows.

In August 2020, it was announced that Levine would become curator of a BBC Radio 4 programme The Museum of Curiosity and co-host alongside John Lloyd, its chief host. Series 15 of the show aired from September to October 2020.

In February 2021, Channel 4 announced a new series called Sex Odyssey, which would be presented by Levine. Among the producers was documentary maker Louis Theroux. Later retitled Sex Actually with Alice Levine, it began airing on 22 September 2021. A second series began airing on 27 February 2023.

In April 2021, Levine began hosting Wondery true crime podcast British Scandal with Matt Forde. The series was nominated for Best Entertainment Podcast and won The Spotlight Award at the British Podcast Awards in 2022.

In June 2021, Very Modern Quests, a role-playing comedy podcast presented by Levine was released as an Audible Original. The series featured celebrity participants such as Greg James, Joe Lycett, and Phil Wang.

Awards and nominations
In 2008, Levine won the National Student Television Award for "Best On-Screen Female".

As the co-creator and presenter of My Dad Wrote a Porno, Levine has received many awards and nominations. The series received nominations at the Audio and Radio Industry Awards, Lovie Awards and British Podcast Awards, as well as winning a Webby Award in 2019.

Personal life
Levine was in a relationship with guitarist Edward Ibbotson of indie rock band Life in Film between 2014 and 2017.

Filmography
Television
 

Radio

Podcasts

References

External links

1986 births
Living people
21st-century English women
Alumni of the University of Leeds
BBC Radio 1 presenters
British columnists
British food writers
British podcasters
British radio DJs
British television presenters
British women podcasters
British women writers
People from Nottingham
Women cookbook writers